Diocese of Atlanta may refer to:

the Episcopal Diocese of Atlanta
the Roman Catholic Archdiocese of Atlanta (Diocese of Atlanta, 1956–1962)